Molly Kate Bernard (born April 10, 1988) is an American actress. She is best known for her role as Lauren Heller on the television series Younger.

Life and career 
Molly Bernard began her career in 2000 in the drama Pay It Forward beside Kevin Spacey and Haley Joel Osment. Bernard’s early credits include a recurring role in the television series Alpha House where she played Angie Sullivan.  In 2015, was cast in the television series Younger alongside Sutton Foster and Hilary Duff, where she portrayed Lauren Heller.

In 2015, she had a small role in the Nancy Meyers comedy The Intern, beside Robert De Niro and Anne Hathaway. Bernard was cast as Young Shelly, sharing a role with Judith Light in Amazon Prime’s Transparent. She appeared in two seasons of the critically acclaimed show. In 2019, Bernard appeared in the comedy Otherhood, a film directed by Cindy Chupack. For two seasons, Bernard has appeared as medical student Elsa Curry in the NBC drama Chicago Med. Bernard has a bachelor's degree from Skidmore College and a MFA in acting from Yale School of Drama.

Personal life 
Bernard is the granddaughter of actor Joseph Bernard.

Molly Bernard announced her engagement to girlfriend Hannah Lieberman on Instagram on January 14, 2020. They were married on September 23, 2021, in Prospect Park, Brooklyn, with her Younger co-stars Nico Tortorella and Hilary Duff in attendance. Bernard announced that she was pregnant on her instagram page in November, 2022.

Bernard is openly pansexual.

Filmography

Film

Television

References

External links 
 
 

American television actresses
Actresses from New York City
Living people
People from Brooklyn
1988 births
American film actresses
20th-century American actresses
21st-century American actresses
Skidmore College alumni
Yale School of Drama alumni
Pansexual actresses
LGBT people from New York (state)
American LGBT actors